Luticola tomsui is a species of non-marine diatom first found in lakes of James Ross Island.

References

Further reading
Kopalová, Kateřina, et al. "THE FRESHWATER DIATOM FLORA FROM TWO CONTRASTING ANTARCTIC LOCALITIES."
Vignoni, Paula A., et al. "Hydrochemical, sedimentological, biological and magnetic characterization of lakes in James Ross Archipelago, Antarctica."

External links
AlgaeBase

Naviculales